Benjamin Crowley ( – 1842) was a 19th-century American pioneer and the namesake of Crowley's Ridge.

Early life and westward migration
Crowley was born in Halifax County, Virginia, the son of Benjamin Crowley and Sarah Strong. By 1787, he was living in Oglethorpe County, Georgia, to which the Crowley and Strong families had migrated. On August 9, 1808 he patented  in Christian County, Kentucky. He was listed living there on the 1810 census. By June 16, 1817, Benjamin was listed in Lawrence County, Arkansas where he was the administrator of his son John's estate.

Crowley's Ridge
On October 12, 1819 Benjamin Crowley purchased land from Solomon Hewitt for $200 on the Spring River about two miles (3 km) above the mouth of the Eleven Point River, on the North side of said Spring River where Benjamin was currently living. The land was in Phillips County, Arkansas. He was listed as a Matross in Hobart's Company of Light Artillery. In 1821 he moved to and founded Crowley's Ridge. In 1832 he founded the Post Office for Greene County, which was formed in 1833. On August 16, 1838, Benjamin Crowley had  bounty land, his son, Wiley, had . Benjamin died in 1842 and is buried at Pioneer Cemetery, also called Shiloh Cemetery. In the 1930s, the Civilian Conservation Corps built numerous buildings on Crowley's Ridge State Park which encompasses his estate. They also constructed a monument where he was buried.

Benjamin Crowley helped found Greene County, Arkansas, was its first postmaster and also founded the first church. He has many descendants living on Crowley's Ridge to this day, and his land, now Crowley's Ridge State Park, is a very popular tourist destination. Arkansas also built the Crowley's Ridge Parkway, linking many of the parks and popular attractions throughout eastern Arkansas.

Personal life
On December 15, 1795, he married Catherine Annie Wiley, the daughter of Peter Wiley and Mary Sharkey. Catherine was born c. 1771 in Augusta County, Virginia and died in 1850 at Crowley (present day Walcott) in Greene County, Arkansas.

Their children were:
Thomas Crowley (March 18, 1796 – bef 1829) who married Cynthia Campbell
Samuel Crowley (February 28, 1798 – March 13, 1837) who married Sarah Lamb and Sarah Hutchins
John Crowley (February 28, 1800 – 1816)
Wiley Crowley (March 27, 1803 – abt 1847) who married Lucy Capps
Polly Crowley (April 5, 1805 – abt 1841) who married Abraham Pevehouse
Benjamin Crowley III (November 1, 1807 – bef 1830) who died building a military road
Margaret Crowley (May 15, 1810 – ?) who married Charles Robertson and John McDaniel
Sarah Crowley (1812–?) who married Thomas Lamb

References
Census records, tax lists, "Fathers of the Ridge," by George Rowland; "A History of Greene County," (13 newspaper articles) by Benjamin H. Crowley; Bureau of Land Management.

1758 births
1842 deaths
American pioneers
Crowley's Ridge
Arkansas Territory
Burials in Arkansas
People from Greene County, Arkansas
People from Halifax County, Virginia
People of pre-statehood Arkansas
United States Army personnel of the War of 1812
Virginia colonial people